, also known as  was a Japanese girl group formed by Avex Trax in 2011.

History

Formed in 2012, Cheeky Parade is one of Japan's rising girl idol groups. Their unique style fuses Japanese Idol music with the seemingly limitless energy of the 9 girls that make up Cheeky Parade. The group's name fittingly represents both the girl's saucy attitude and the parade-like excitement they generate. Cheeky Parade is on the Avex idol label, “iDOL Street”, and debuted with their 1st single “BUNBUN NINE9’” in January 2013. Their 1st single ranked in at #4 on the Oricon weekly chart, and their 2nd single and 3rd singles, “C.P.U !?” and “Mugendai Shoujo” also made the top five, ranking in at #5 and #4 respectively. Cheeky Parade made history as the first Japanese act to ever perform at the CBGB Music & Film Festival.

In October 2014, Cheeky Parade was invited to do a special live in New York City's Times Square. Recordings of the trip were featured in the music video for "CANDY POP GALAXY BOMB!!" including their live and appearance at New York Comic Con.

On 28 June 2016, Marin Yamamoto and Mariya Suzuki started a two-year hiatus with GEM member Maaya Takeda to study abroad in Los Angeles, California to study music and dance.

In April 2017, Cheeky Parade performed a remix version of "Shout along!" at SXSW 2017 live from Tokyo via NTT Japan Factory's "cyber teleportation" technology. The performance could be found in iDOL Street's official YouTube channel.

On 19 May 2017, members Seran Mizorogi and Momoka Kodakari announced their departure from Cheeky Parade. Their last live with Cheeky Parade was held on 9 June 2017.

During January 2015, members Asami Watanabe, Seran Mizorogi, and Hina Nagai formed a subunit called NERFY GUINER BIEBER with Watanabe as WATANABE (ワタナベ), Mizorogi as ROGY (ロギー), and Nagai leading as GUINER (ガイナー). The subunit performs as an opening act for Cheeky Parade. After Mizorogi's departure from Cheeky Parade in 2017, Rino Shimazaki joined the subunit as Motherky (マザーキー).

On April 12, 2018 Cheeky Parade announced they will disband on July 31, 2018. The group will hold their last concert as 7 members, with Marin Yamamoto and Mariya Suzuki returning from their hiatus to participate in the show.

Members

Current members

Former Members

Discography

Albums

Singles

Music Cards

Collaborations

Music videos

References

External links
Cheeky Parade Official Website 
Cheeky Parade Official Website (avex network) 
iDOL Street Official YouTube Channel including "Chikipa Tsūshin" 
Cheeky Parade Official USTREAM Channel 
Cheeky Parade Official Blog 

Japanese girl groups
Japanese idol groups
Musical groups established in 2012
2012 establishments in Japan
Musical groups disestablished in 2018